ORF 1 (ORF eins) is an Austrian public television channel owned by ORF. It was the first television channel in Austria, started in 1955.

ORF 1 is one of four public TV channels in Austria. It is funded by a mixture of advertising revenue and television licence fees: as such, unlike the German TV stations (which are generally available free-to-air), ORF 1 and its sister channels are encrypted over satellite.

Programming 
ORF 1 mainly shows films, TV series and sporting events; this is in contrast to ORF 2, which focuses more on news, documentaries and cultural programming. As the target audience of ORF 1 is younger than that of ORF 2, ORF's children's output, okidoki, is broadcast on ORF 1 every morning. Popular sporting events, such as skiing, Formula One and association football are also usually shown on ORF 1. ORF has exclusive rights to many sports; for example, it holds the rights to Formula One until 2020. In addition to the regular commentary, some sporting events, as well as some dramas, carry special commentary tracks for the visually impaired, via the Zweikanalton system.

Until 9 April 2007, ORF's flagship news programme Zeit im Bild (The Times in Pictures) was broadcast at 7:30pm on both ORF 1 and ORF 2; as part of a major programme overhaul, this was replaced on ORF 1 with the soap opera Mitten im 8en. Due to poor ratings, the soap was short-lived and was replaced on 2 July 2007 by Malcolm in the Middle. To fill the void left by removing Zeit im Bild from ORF 1, two new news programmes entitled ZiB 20 and ZiB 24 were introduced; as their names suggest, they are broadcast at 8pm (20:00) and midnight (24:00) every night. In addition, short bulletins known as ZiB Flash are shown several times throughout the day.

Feature films form a key part of the primetime output on ORF 1, and are shown several nights a week: many movie premieres are shown at the same time as on German broadcasters, but without the commercial interruptions that are commonplace on private German channels. Certain films and series are broadcast with both the German dub and the original (usually English) soundtrack via Zweikanalton (Two-channel sound).

Children

Fireman Sam
Maya the Bee (Die Biene Maja) (2013–present)
Princess Sarah
Peg + Cat
Story of the Alps: My Annette
Tales of Little Women
Zig & Sharko
Marsupilami (Marsupilami - die neuen abenteuer) (2008-2015) (Season 1)
The Bush Baby

Entertainment 
Eurovision Song Contest

Information 
Zeit im Bild

Series 

9-1-1 (2018–present)
About a Boy (2018)
Altes Geld (2015, 2017)
Babylon Berlin (2018–present)
Desperate Housewives (2005-201?)
Devious Maids (Devious Maids - Schmutzige Geheimnisse) (2014, 2016-2017)
Ghost Whisperer (2007-201?)
Glee (2011–present)
Grey's Anatomy (2006–present)
Kupetzky (2006)
Last Man Standing (2014-2017)
Liar (2018)
Magda macht das schon! (2017–present)
NCIS: Los Angeles (2010-)
Seinfeld (2007)
Stalker (2015, 2017-2018)
Station 19 (Seattle Firefighters - Die jungen Helden) (2018–present)
Tatort (2006-2009, 2016)
Touch (2012, 2014, 2018)
The Big Bang Theory (2010–present)
The Defenders (2011, 2013–2014)
The Mentalist (2009-201?)
The Unusuals (2013-2014)
Two and a Half Men (2005-2017)
Who Is America? (2018–present)
Young Sheldon (2018–present)

Sport 
 FIFA World Cup
 Formula One
 UEFA European Football Championship

High definition broadcast 
On 28 January 2008, ORF started its high-definition services. The first broadcast was a ski race called The Nightrace in Schladming. A special HDTV event, introducing HD technology, was scheduled in all regional ORF stations right after. The technological partner for HD productions is Telekom Austria. Test operations began on 1 May 2008: ten days later, these were made available to any households with an ORF card showing a trailer. Those who could receive ORF 1 HD would see a trailer which showed excerpts from sports footage, films and documentaries.

ORF 1 HD officially launched on 2 June 2008, five days before the start of 2008 UEFA European Football Championship.

Reception 
ORF 1 HD is broadcast on Astra 19.2° east on 10,832 GHz horizontal (SR 22000, FEC 5/6). The channel is also available through Cable and IPTV.

Programming 
Initially, the vast majority of programmes were upscaled, save for some sporting events, movie premieres and American television series. However, this has gradually increased; more and more of ORF's productions have been in HD, and many older copies of movies and TV series were re-sourced and replaced with HD scans; for example, older episodes of The Simpsons have been remastered in HD and, as of 2017, are broadcast in this format on ORF 1.

Parental guidance 
ORF abridges some movies due to child-protection rules, but less often than German stations. ORF identifies its programs with initials: X (not suited for children; parental guidance advised), O (adults only), or with no initial. The sign K+ (recommended for children) is shown only on teletext.

Branding 

From 1968 until 1992, ORF 1 prominently featured the red "ORF eye" logo in its television idents alongside several stylised number "1" logos. In 1992, the first version of the "green cube" ORF 1 logo was introduced, designed by Neville Brody. In 2000, ORF 1's logo was updated into a moving, soft-edged, gelatinous cube with the number 1 inside. This particular logo has been nicknamed "Jelli." In 2005, there was another update to ORF's on-screen design: to avoid the logo being burnt in to plasma screens, it was changed from green to grey all-over.

In 2010, it was announced that ORF 1 would be rebranded as "ORF eins" from 8 January 2011.

On 26 April 2019, ORF eins was renamed back to ORF 1 with a brand new logo and on-screen design by design agency Bleed.

Logos

References

External links
ORF eins TV listings

Television stations in Austria
Television channels and stations established in 1955
1955 establishments in Austria
ORF (broadcaster)